Gaius Oppius Sabinus (died AD 85) was a Roman Senator who held at least one office in the emperor's service. He was ordinary consul in the year 84 as the colleague of emperor Domitian.

Sabinus was probably the son or nephew of Spurius Oppius, suffect consul in the nundinium of October-December 43. Following his consulate, Oppius Sabinus acceded to governor of the imperial province of Moesia. He served in this position for only a few months when an army of Dacians under Diurpaneus crossed the Danube and invaded the province. Sabinus was killed in the winter of 85/86 AD fighting the invaders. 

Administration of the province fell upon one of the legionary legates, until the new governor, Marcus Cornelius Nigrinus, could arrive. Meanwhile the Dacians ravaged the province and burned a number of forts along the Danube. Domitian, accompanied by his praetorian prefect Cornelius Fuscus, quickly traveled to Moesia with reinforcements to drive the Dacians out of Roman territories; these were the opening moves of Domitian's Dacian War.

References

Further reading 
 Mócsy, András (1974) Pannonia and Upper Moesia, Routledge, 1974
 Prosopographia Imperii Romani (PIR) ² O 122

1st-century Romans
Year of birth unknown
85 deaths
Senators of the Roman Empire
Imperial Roman consuls
Roman governors of Moesia
Ancient Romans killed in action